Tibit or tibits may refer to:

 Tibit - the unit symbol of tebibit
Tibit/s, a data rate of tebibit per second 
Tibits (restaurant chain), vegetarian restaurant chain in Switzerland

See also